Lakeside Park may refer to:

In Australia
 Lakeside Park, formerly Lakeside International Raceway, an Australian motor racing facility

In Canada
 Lakeside Park, in St Catharines, Ontario, Canada

In England
 Lakeside Park, Guildford, a Local Nature Reserve in England

In Slovakia
 Lakeside Park (Bratislava), an office complex in the capital of Slovakia

In United States
 Lakeside Park, Indiana, an unincorporated community in the United States
 Lakeside Park, Kosciusko County, Indiana, an unincorporated community in the United States
 Lakeside Park, Kentucky, a small city in the United States
 Lakeside Park, New Jersey, an unincorporated community in the United States
 Lakeside Park, a city park on Lake Merritt in Oakland, California

Other uses
 "Lakeside Park" (song) by Rush about Lakeside Park in St Catharines, Ontario, Canada